Charles Odilon Roger Rousseau, CC (6 February 1921 – 26 September 1986)  was a Canadian ambassador, administrator and soldier. He was head of the Montreal Olympic Organizing Committee (COJO) for the 1976 Summer Olympics in Montreal.

He served in the Royal Canadian Air Force during World War II, but became a prisoner of war in 1942 until the war's end.

He was born in Trois-Pistoles, Quebec and died of cancer in Ottawa, Ontario.

Diplomatic posts

1969–1972: Ambassador to the Central African Republic
1970–1972: Ambassador to Chad, Gabon, and Cameroon
1977–1981: Ambassador to the Dominican Republic and Venezuela
1981–1985: High Commissioner to New Zealand, Fiji, Kiribati, Tonga, Tuvalu, and Western Samoa

References

External links

1921 births
1986 deaths
Companions of the Order of Canada
People from Trois-Pistoles, Quebec
Royal Canadian Air Force personnel of World War II
Canadian prisoners of war in World War II
Ambassadors of Canada to the Central African Republic
Deaths from cancer in Ontario
Ambassadors of Canada to Gabon
Ambassadors of Canada to Cameroon
Ambassadors of Canada to Chad
High Commissioners of Canada to New Zealand
High Commissioners of Canada to Fiji
High Commissioners of Canada to Kiribati
High Commissioners of Canada to Tonga
High Commissioners of Canada to Samoa
High Commissioners of Canada to Tuvalu
French Quebecers
Presidents of the Organising Committees for the Olympic Games